WMMM-FM (105.5 MHz) is a radio station licensed to Verona, Wisconsin, serving the Madison, Wisconsin area.  The station is owned by Audacy, Inc. and runs an adult album alternative format as "105-5 Triple M."  WMMM-FM formerly aired "The Studio M Channel," a 24-hour format of songs recorded from “Studio M” on its HD Radio subchannel (105.5-HD2).

Audacy Madison Operations Manager, Chase Daniels, is responsible for programming WMMM. Jonathan Suttin, of Jonathan and Kitty in the Morning, is the Assistant Program Director and Music Director.

References

External links

MMM-FM
Adult album alternative radio stations in the United States
Radio stations established in 1991
Audacy, Inc. radio stations